Ellis E. Williams (born June 28, 1951) is an American film and television actor/comedian who is better known for playing "Henry Hughley" (father of Darryl Hughley, played by comedian D.L. Hughley) on the sitcom, The Hughleys.

Early life
Williams was born and raised in Brunswick, Georgia, United States.

Career
Williams made his television debut in 1980 on Saturday Night Live, appearing in the chorus of The Pirates of Penzance when the cast of that Broadway show was the episode's musical guest. In 1984, he appeared in a feature film, The Brother From Another Planet, as well as appearing a TV movie, Code Name: Foxfire as a street singer. He appeared in Eddie Murphy's 1987 documentary stand-up, Eddie Murphy Raw, as Eddie's uncle.

Then Williams appeared in films such as: Second Sight, Def by Temptation and Basketball Dreams. In 1991, he made his first television appearance (since SNL in 1980), on an episode of Law & Order, as Ray Bell, then he appeared in numerous films: Hangin' with the Homeboys and Strictly Business, opposite Halle Berry, Anne-Marie Johnson, Tommy Davidson, and Samuel L. Jackson. Other films include: Me and Veronica, The Saint of Fort Washington, The Little Death, A River Made to Drown In, 8 Heads in a Duffel Bag, The Glimmer Man, Eye for an Eye, among others.

Williams appeared in numerous sitcoms including: Hangin' with Mr. Cooper, Step by Step, Martin, The Jamie Foxx Show, Roc, The Wayans Bros., Any Day Now and Malcolm in the Middle.

Filmography

Film

Television

References

External links

Ellis E. Williams at the Internet Off-Broadway Database

1951 births
Living people
American male television actors
People from Brunswick, Georgia
Male actors from Georgia (U.S. state)